Reading Central Library is a public library in the town of Reading, in the English county of Berkshire.

History 
From 1882, the main library was in Reading Town Hall. However, as early as World War I complaints were being made there was insufficient space for books and readers. It was only in 1982 that plans started being laid for a new central library in Reading, and building starting in 1984. This new building was opened in 1985.

The central library is in the heart of Reading on Abbey Square on the corner of the King's Road, on the former site of the Reading Abbey stables where the horses of medieval churchmen, nobility and royalty were stabled. It is also very near the old Abbey gateway, where Jane Austen went to school, and which is the ancestor of the current Abbey School. Reading Central Library is a four-storey red brick building based on traditional Reading brick designs. The Holy Brook runs underneath the Library and it is near The Oracle to the south west and to the north lies the beautiful Forbury Gardens.

The Central Library contains over 100,000 books including a children's library, a large selection of fiction and non fiction books, and free Internet terminals provided as part of The People's Network. It also provides loans of CDs, DVDs, and videos for which there is a small charge and also has a large collection of vocal and drama sets on the second floor. The Third floor contains the Reading Local Studies Library which has large collections of books, photographs, maps and newspapers relating to the history of Reading and Berkshire, as well as a family history section. Special collections include books and letters by local author Mary Russell Mitford and local MP, judge and author Thomas Noon Talfourd.

Books in the library are generally ordered by Dewey Decimal Classification, though the Local Studies collection has its own library classification system. The online library catalogue which includes a selection of digitised local Studies photographs can be found on the library website. It is run by a team of qualified librarians with the support of library assistants with the aim of providing good library services to the people of Reading.

External links
Reading Libraries website

References

Reading Borough Libraries (2005). Reading Borough Libraries. Retrieved 12 August 2005.

Library buildings completed in 1985
Public libraries in Berkshire
Central